Abatocera is a genus of beetles in the family Cerambycidae, containing the following species:

subgenus Abatocera
 Abatocera arnaudi Rigout, 1987
 Abatocera irregularis Vollenhoven, 1871
 Abatocera leonina (Thomson, 1865)

subgenus Sternobatocera
 Abatocera keyensis Breuning, 1943
 Abatocera subirregularis Breuning, 1954

References

Batocerini
Cerambycidae genera